Three Sisters may refer to:

Geography

Australia 
 Three Sisters (Australia), a rock formation near Katoomba, NSW
 The Three Sisters (Queensland), three islands
 Three Sisters Island (Tasmania), three small islands

Canada 
 The Three Sisters (Alberta), three peaks in the Canadian Rockies near Canmore, Alberta
 The Three Sisters (Lake Huron), three islands in Lake Huron
 The Three Sisters (Temagami), three lakes in Temagami, Ontario
 Three Sisters (Elk Valley), three peaks in the Canadian Rockies just north of the town of Fernie, British Columbia
 Three Sisters Range, three peaks in the Stikine Country, British Columbia
 Three Sisters Lakes Provincial Park, a park near Hixon, British Columbia
 Three Sisters, a rock formation along the shore of Cape Chignecto Provincial Park

Ireland 
 The Three Sisters (Ireland), three rivers
 An Triúr Deirféar (Irish for The Three Sisters), three peaks on the Dingle Peninsula

South Africa 
 Three Sisters (Northern Cape), a rock formation consisting of a group of three conical peaks situated on the watershed between Beaufort West and Richmond

United Kingdom 
 Three Sisters (Glen Coe), three ridges
 Three Sisters Recreation Area, Wigan

United States 
 Three Sisters, mineral springs at Lake Ouachita State Park, Arkansas
 Three Sisters (Los Angeles County), a mountain range in California
 Three Sisters (Riverside County), a mountain range in California
 Three Sisters (Siskiyou County), a mountain range in California
 Three Sisters (District of Columbia), three islands
 Three Sisters Springs (Florida)
 Three Sisters (Georgia), three peaks
 Three Sisters (Oregon), three volcanoes
 Three Sisters Wilderness, Oregon
 Three Sisters (Pittsburgh), three bridges in Pennsylvania

Stage, film and television
 Three Sisters (play), a play by Anton Chekhov
 The Three Sisters (1966 film), an American film
 Three Sisters (1970 film), a British film directed by Laurence Olivier
 The Three Sisters (1970 film), a British television adaptation
 Three Sisters (1988 film), aka Love and Fear, directed by Margarethe von Trotta
 Three Sisters (1994 film), a Russian film adaptation
 Three Sisters (opera), a 1998 opera by Péter Eötvös
 The Three Sisters (fairy tale), an Italian fairy tale
 The Three Sisters (1930 film), an American film directed by Paul Sloane
 Three Sisters (musical), a 1934 musical by Jerome Kern and Oscar Hammerstein II
 Three Sisters (1934 film), a Chinese film of the 1930s
 Three Sisters (2012 film), a Chinese documentary film
 Three Sisters (2020 film) a 2020 South Korean film

 Three Sisters (American TV series), a 2001–2002 American TV series starring Dyan Cannon, Katherine LaNasa, and David Alan Basche
 Three Sisters (South Korean TV series), a 2010 South Korean television drama

Mythology
 Gorgons, three sisters in Greek mythology, named Stheno, Euryale, and Medusa
 Graeae, three grey sisters (witches) in Greek mythology, named Deino, Enyo, and Pemphredo

Other uses
 Three Sisters (album), a 2004 album by Alice Donut
 Three Sisters (agriculture), a Native American agricultural technique for planting maize (corn), beans, and squash close together for shared benefits
 Three Sisters (sternwheeler), a steamboat
 Three Sisters tomato, a variety of tomato
 Three Sisters Bridge, a cancelled bridge over the Potomac River in Washington, D.C.
 Three Sisters Tavern, a restaurant in Portland, Oregon
 Three Sisters of Nauset, a trio of lighthouses in Nauset, Massachusetts
 Three sisters, a name for a combination of rogue waves, particularly on Lake Superior
 "The Three Sisters" is a colloquial phrase referring to the Dutch Reformed Church in South Africa (NGK), Dutch Reformed Church in South Africa (NHK), and Reformed Churches in South Africa
 Orion's Belt, a part of the Orion constellation, or group of stars, located on the celestial equator

See also 
 Drei Schwestern
 Three Sisters Islands (disambiguation)
 Tri Sestry
 Tři sestry (Czech band)
 The Triplets bridges